Tataouine Governorate is the southernmost of the twenty-four governorates of Tunisia, the only one to border both Algeria and Libya. It is also the largest, covering an area of 38,889 km². It had a population of 149,453 (at the 2014 census), nearly tied for second least-populated with Kebili (156,961) after Tozeur (107,912). The capital is Tataouine.

This is where George Lucas filmed part of Star Wars, and a homophone of the city was chosen to be the home planet of the protagonist's family (Tatooine).

Geography
Wells from aquifers dot the eastern slopes of the pronounced long escarpment climbing gradually from 100 m to 500 m in elevation two provinces north in the south extreme of Gabes Governorate, passing through a thin strip of Medenine and then at the heart of the province ending around a capital city Tripoli, Libya.  The ridge attracts variable winter and early spring relief precipitation and little other rain and shares with the rest of the area a hot desert climate (Köppen climate classification BWh) with long, extremely hot summers throughout (see North-south graduation of Tunisian climatic zones), the patchy and infrequent rainfall in winter is greater than the average for the Sahara Desert of which the area forms part.  Approximately half of the escarpment exceeds 500 m in the province, the peak within Tunisia being 631 m near the town of Remada on the main road south of Tatouine leading into mid-eastern Libya.  The tripoint of the three countries is close to the Libyan town of Ghadames which has surrounding it three airstrips, one of which constitutes an airport and one of which lies in Algeria.  Close to the west or south-west border is El Borma Airport and the province has a second, which is for defence and rescue, Remada Air Base.

Administrative divisions
The Tataouine Governorate is divided into seven delegations (mutamadiyat) and further divided into 64 sectors (imada). The delegations with their populations at the 2004 and 2014 censuses are listed below:

Five municipalities are in Tataouine Governorate:

References

External links

 
Governorates of Tunisia